Sead Šehović (born 22 August 1989) is a Montenegrin professional basketball player for Mornar of the ABA League and the Montenegrin League. He is the younger brother of professional basketball player Suad Šehović.

Career 
For the 2006–07 season he played for KK Bosna. In April 2007 Šehović made his first visit to the United States playing with the top American prospects in the Boo Williams Invitational tournament.

In 2008 he played for national youth team on European Championship U20 in Riga, Latvia, where he showed some interesting potential. In 2009 he played at both, the youth and senior level, for the Montenegro national basketball team. Sehovic first competed at the 2009 U20 European Championship Men where he averaged 17.6 points per contest, including a 36-point, six-rebound performance against the Ukraine. Then he suited up for the senior team where he scored 15 in a win over Iceland that helped propel Montenegro into Division A.

In 2009 he was one of the 15 candidates nominated in a Young Men Player of the Year category, by FIBA Europe, while in Montenegro he was proclaimed for the best young player.

In 2011 he signed a contract with the EWE Baskets Oldenburg to play in the German league. He later played with Szolnoki Olaj and BBC Bayreuth. On December 30, 2013, he signed with MZT Aerodrom.

On July 28, 2015, he signed with Budućnost Podgorica. On June 21, 2019, Šehović signed for Mornar.

Career statistics

Domestic leagues

References

External links 
 Sead Šehović at aba-liga.com
 Sead Šehović at eurobasket.com
 Sead Šehović at euroleague.net

1989 births
Living people
ABA League players
Bosniaks of Montenegro
EWE Baskets Oldenburg players
KK Bosna Royal players
KK Budućnost players
KK Mornar Bar players
KK MZT Skopje players
Medi Bayreuth players
Montenegrin expatriate basketball people in Hungary
Montenegrin men's basketball players
People from Bijelo Polje
Shooting guards
Small forwards
Szolnoki Olaj KK players
2019 FIBA Basketball World Cup players